William Douglas Barber (17 October 1881 – 26 April 1971) was an English cricketer. He was a right-handed batsman and wicket-keeper who played for Nottinghamshire. He was born in Eastwood and died in Nottinghamshire.

Barber was commissioned a second lieutenant in the 1st Battalion, King's Royal Rifle Corps on 4 May 1901. He served with the battalion in South Africa during the later part of the Second Boer War. Following the end of the war, he left South Africa in September 1902 with other men of his regiment on the SS Sardinia, which took them to a new posting at Malta.

Barber's first-class debut came in 1904, against Lancashire. Barber scored 7 runs in the only innings in which he batted in the match.

Twenty years after his sole County Championship appearance, Barber played for the Army cricket team against Oxford University. The game finished in an innings defeat for the Army team.

References

External links
William Barber at Cricket Archive 

1881 births
1971 deaths
English cricketers
Nottinghamshire cricketers
People from Eastwood, Nottinghamshire
Cricketers from Nottinghamshire
British Army cricketers
People educated at Eton College
British Army personnel of the Second Boer War
King's Royal Rifle Corps officers